Utah State Board of Education (USBE) is the state education agency of Utah. Its headquarters are in Salt Lake City.

References

External links
 Utah State Board of Education